Melody of Certain Damaged Lemons is the fifth studio album by American alternative rock band Blonde Redhead. It was released on June 6, 2000 by Touch and Go Records. The album was recorded at Bear Creek Studio in Woodinville, and was produced by Guy Picciotto and Ryan Hadlock.

The final song on Melody of Certain Damaged Lemons, "For the Damaged Coda", is based on Nocturne in F minor, Op. 55, No. 1 by Frédéric Chopin. Years after the album's release, "For the Damaged Coda" gained renewed exposure after appearing in the animated TV series Rick and Morty as the recurring theme for the character Evil Morty.

Critical reception

Melody of Certain Damaged Lemons was met with generally favorable reviews from critics. At Metacritic, which assigns a normalized rating out of 100 to reviews from mainstream publications, the album received an average score of 73 based on eight reviews.

Track listing

Personnel
Credits are adapted from the album's liner notes.

Blonde Redhead
 Kazu Makino
 Amedeo Pace
 Simone Pace

Additional personnel
 Toby Christensen – piano on "Loved Despite of Great Faults", "A Cure", "For the Damaged" and "For the Damaged Coda"
 Ryan Hadlock – production, engineering
 Guy Picciotto – production
 Howie Weinberg – mastering
 Brad Zeffren – engineering (second)

References

External links
 
 

2000 albums
Blonde Redhead albums
Albums produced by Guy Picciotto
Albums recorded at Bear Creek Studio
Touch and Go Records albums